Roger Brown (born 4 July 1968) is a British rower. He competed at the 1992 Summer Olympics and the 1996 Summer Olympics.

Brown graduated from Durham University (Hild Bede College) in 1989. He is a former member of Durham University Boat Club. In 1990 he took Gold in the Men's Eight at the Under-23 World Rowing Championships, then known as the Nations Cup, alongside fellow DUBC member Russell Slatford.

References

External links
 

1968 births
Living people
British male rowers
Durham University Boat Club rowers
Olympic rowers of Great Britain
Rowers at the 1992 Summer Olympics
Rowers at the 1996 Summer Olympics
Sportspeople from Hexham
Alumni of the College of St Hild and St Bede, Durham